HD 6718 is a solar twin star in the equatorial constellation of Cetus. It has a yellow hue but is too faint to be viewed with the naked eye, having an apparent visual magnitude of 8.45. The distance to this object, as determined from parallax measurements, is 168 light years. It is drifting away from the Sun with a radial velocity of +35 km/s.

This object is an ordinary G-type main-sequence star with a stellar classification of G5V, with the luminosity class of 'V' indicating it is generating energy through hydrogen fusion at its core. It is around six billion years old with a leisurely rotation rate, having a projected rotational velocity of 2 km/s. The level of magnetic activity in the chromosphere is considered very low and it has a near solar metallicity. Being a solar twin, has nearly the same mass and radius as the Sun. The star is radiating 1.07 times the luminosity of the Sun from its photosphere at an effective temperature of 5,728 K.

In 2020, the inclination of this object was measured, revealing its true mass to be . This makes it a brown dwarf.

See also 
 List of extrasolar planets

References 

G-type main-sequence stars
Solar twins
Brown dwarfs
Cetus (constellation)
Durchmusterung objects
006718
005301